Sportsworld was an Australian sports information program shown on Seven Network. The program was broadcast from 9.00am–11.00am following Weekend Sunrise on Sunday mornings, from Seven's Martin Place streetfront studios in Sydney.

Prior to its final format, Sportsworld had usually been shown on Sunday mornings since its debut in the 1990s. Its host then was Bruce McAvaney. It was then revamped to a sport panel show in which Johanna Griggs hosted alongside Paul Salmon out of Seven Melbourne. In 2004, it was revamped into a chat style show with Johanna Griggs and Sandy Roberts. Matthew White replaced Roberts in late 2004. The program's final season was 2006; it was not renewed due to budget concerns and time constraints due to AFL and V8 Supercars, two sports which the Seven Network were to regain the broadcasting rights to in 2007.

Presenters
Presenters on this show included:
Garry Wilkinson
Rex Mossop
Kylie Gillies
Johanna Griggs
Rex Hunt
Dixie Marshall
Bruce McAvaney
Sandy Roberts
Paul Salmon
Matthew White
Cameron Williams

External links
Sportsworld at the National Film and Sound Archive

Seven Network original programming
Seven Sport
Australian sports television series
1990 Australian television series debuts
2006 Australian television series endings